Anthony F. Ciampi  (January 29, 1816 – November 24, 1893) was an Italian-American priest of the Catholic Church and member of the Society of Jesus.

Early life 

Antonio F. Ciampi was born on January 29, 1816, in Rome, Papal States, to a prominent family. One of his uncles was Cardinal Giuseppe Sala. Ciampi studied at the Pontifical Gregorian University, before entering the Jesuit novitiate at Sant'Andrea al Quirinale in Rome on September 7, 1832. Following his philosophical studies at the Gregorian University, he taught grammar at a Jesuit school in Piacenza from 1839 to 1840. He then transferred to a school in Ferrara, where he taught grammar and the humanities from 1840 to 1844. In 1845, he returned to Rome to study theology for one year.

Ciampi was then invited by James A. Ryder, the president of the College of the Holy Cross in Worcester, Massachusetts, to become a missionary to the United States; Ciampi accepted and sailed for the United States. He continued his studies at Georgetown University in Washington, D.C., where he was ordained a priest on July 23, 1848.

College of the Holy Cross

First presidency 
Ciampi was appointed the President of the College of the Holy Cross on August 28, 1851. Within a year of his appointment, on July 14, 1852, a devastating fire consumed the entire college building, except for its east wing and library, despite the efforts of the fire department and local citizens of Worcester to haul water a quarter of a mile up the hill from the river. The student dormitories with their possessions were lost, and the uninsured college faced a cost of $50,000. The fire was believed to have begun on the third floor by a professor who was burning old examination papers. Left without any place to stay, the neighbors offered lodging to the faculty and students. Within a few months, work began on rebuilding the school using the contributions of donors throughout the Diocese of Boston. A new and larger building was opened on October 3, 1853.

Death 
Ciampi died on November 24, 1893, in Washington, D.C., aged 77, and was buried in the Jesuit Community Cemetery at Georgetown.

References

Sources

Further reading

External links 

 Profile at College of the Holy Cross
 

1816 births
1893 deaths
Pontifical Gregorian University alumni
Clergy from Rome
19th-century Italian Jesuits
19th-century American Jesuits
Pastors of Holy Trinity Catholic Church (Washington, D.C.)
Pastors of St. Ignatius Church (Baltimore)
Italian emigrants to the United States
Presidents of the College of the Holy Cross
Presidents of Loyola University Maryland
Burials at the Jesuit Community Cemetery